Kvemo Orozmani is a village in Dmanisi Municipality of Kvemo Kartli region in Georgia. According to the 2014 census it had a population of 361.

Near the village, in the Dmanisi Municipality rich with significant archaeological discoveries, stone weapons and traces of early Palaeolithic settlements appear to back hypotheses about "another prehistoric object of international significance" in the area, a Georgian National Museum release said. 
Scientists have dated the findings back 1.77-1.84 million years and credited the unearthed material with having "completely changed [the previous] understanding of the Orozmani site".

References 

Populated places in Kvemo Kartli